The Wellington Blaze is the women's representative cricket team for the New Zealand city of Wellington. They play their home games at Basin Reserve. They compete in the Hallyburton Johnstone Shield one-day competition and the Women's Super Smash Twenty20 competition. They are the most successful side in the history of the Super Smash, with seven title wins, as well as being the current holders of the Hallyburton Johnstone Shield.

History
Wellington played in the first Hallyburton Johnstone Shield in 1935–36, in which they beat Auckland to claim the title. They subsequently defended the title over the next two seasons, before losing it to Auckland in 1939–40.

Wellington have gone on to win the Shield (under various names) 18 times. They had periods of dominance in the 1950s, where they won the title five times, and in the 1970s, where they won the title a further five times. Throughout the 1980s and 1990s, Canterbury dominated the competition, winning the title 20 out of 21 times, but Wellington were the side to break their streak, topping the points table in 1989–90 with three wins from four matches. They next won the one-day competition was in 2003–04, when they shared the trophy with Canterbury after the final was rained-off. Between 2006–07 and 2021–22, they lost in the final seven times, including three times in a row between 2008–09 and 2010–11, before again winning the competition in 2022–23, beating Canterbury in the final..

Wellington have also played in the Super Smash since its inaugural season in 2008–09, and are the most successful side in the history of the competition, with six title wins. They won the title in 2008–09, 2012–13, 2014–15 and three times in a row in 2017–18, 2018–19 and 2019–20. In 2020–21, they lost in the final to Canterbury by 4 wickets, despite a hat-trick from Wellington bowler Amelia Kerr, and Wellington batter Sophie Devine ending the season as the tournament's leading run-scorer. They regained their title in 2021–22, however, going unbeaten in the group stage before beating Otago Sparks in the final by 75 runs.

Grounds
Wellington's primary home ground from their first match in 1937 until the 1950s was Basin Reserve, and they began using the ground consistently again from 2014. In between these periods, Wellington used grounds such as Kilbirnie Park in Wellington, Te Whiti Park in Lower Hutt and Petone Recreation Ground, also in Lower Hutt. 

From the 2000s, Wellington began using Karori Park, Wellington, as well as Trentham Memorial Park, Upper Hutt. In 2021–22, they played most of their matches at Basin Reserve, as well as two at Karori Park. In 2022–23, the played most of their matches at Basin Reserve, as well as two at Hutt Recreation Ground.

Players

Current squad
Based on squad for the 2022–23 season. Players in bold have international caps.

Notable players
Players who have played for Wellington and played internationally are listed below, in order of first international appearance (given in brackets):

 Hilda Buck (1935)
 Mabel Corby (1935)
 Agnes Ell (1935)
 Phyl Blackler (1948)
 Vi Farrell (1948)
 Joan Francis (1948)
 Billie Fulford (1948)
 Joan Hatcher (1948)
 Ina Lamason (1948)
 Joy Lamason (1948)
 Dot Bailey (1949)
 Verna Coutts (1954)
 Jean Coulston (1954)
 Joyce Currie (1954)
 Jean Stonell (1957)
 Gwen Sutherland (1957)
 Betty Thorner (1957)
 Joyce Dalton (1958)
 Jackie Lord (1966)
 Trish McKelvey (1966)
 Betty Maker (1966)
 Wendy Coe (1966)
 Barbara Bevege (1973)
 Maureen Peters (1973)
 Cheryl Henshilwood (1977)
 Viv Sexton (1978)
 Linda Lindsay (1978)
 Linda Fraser (1982)
 Mary Harris (1982)
 Gillian McConway (1982)
 Ingrid van der Elst (1982)
 Di Caird (1984)
 Jackie Clark (1984)
 Nancy Williams (1985)
 Julie Harris (1987)
 Penny Kinsella (1988)
 Maia Lewis (1992)
 Karen Musson (1993)
 Justine Russell (1995)
 Jill Saulbrey (1995)
 Justine Fryer (1996)
 Anna Smith (1996)
 Losi Harford (1997)
 Erin McDonald (2000)
 Mandie Godliman (2002)
 Frances King (2002)
 Anna Dodd (2002)
 Fiona Fraser (2002)
 Amanda Green (2003)
 Kate Blackwell (2004)
 Eimear Richardson (2005)
 Sarah Taylor (2006)
 Sophie Devine (2006)
 Rachel Priest (2007)
 Lucy Doolan (2008)
 Lauren Ebsary (2008)
 Sian Ruck (2009)
 Liz Perry (2010)
 Fran Wilson (2010)
 Kerry-Anne Tomlinson (2011)
 Maddy Green (2012)
 Leigh Kasperek (2015)
 Thamsyn Newton (2015)
 Amelia Kerr (2016)
 Priyanaz Chatterji (2018)
 Erin Burns (2019)
 Jess Kerr (2020)
 Georgia Plimmer (2022)
 Jess McFadyen (2022)
 Rebecca Burns (2022)

Coaching staff

Head Coach: Lance Dry
Batting Coach: Luke Woodcock

Honours
 Hallyburton Johnstone Shield:
 Winners (17): 1935–36, 1937–38, 1938–39, 1949–50, 1950–51, 1958–59, 1959–60, 1967–68, 1969–70, 1973–74, 1974–75, 1976–77, 1977–78, 1989–90, 2022–23; shared (1): 2003–04 
 Women's Super Smash:
 Winners (7): 2008–09, 2012–13, 2014–15, 2017–18, 2018–19, 2019–20, 2021–22

See also
 Wellington cricket team

References

Women's cricket teams in New Zealand
Cricket in Wellington
Super Smash (cricket)